J.E. Benson Public School (formerly Wyandotte Street School) was an elementary school in Windsor, Ontario, Canada. J.E. Benson School is administered by the Greater Essex County District School Board, which also services sixty-one other elementary schools located in Windsor, Ontario and Essex County, Ontario.

History 
Construction began in 1914, just before the outbreak of the First World War; the school opened in April 1915. Originally named Wyandotte Street School, the building contained twelve classrooms and a Manual Training Room. Ten of the rooms were in use by 1916, and by 1917 the school was in full use. J.E. Benson's, or at the time Wyandotte Street School's, first principal was Mr. Fred Snider and the first recorded attendance was 95 students.

Addition 
In 1921–1922, Sandwich Township was annexed by the city of Windsor; this included a three-room school that now fell under the jurisdiction of the Wyandotte Street School. The combination of students from Sandwich Township and the rapid population growth being experienced by the city from the post-war twenties, made it necessary for the School Board to provide additional rooms and accordingly built a fifteen-room addition. The new edition officially opened at noon, Thursday December 20, 1923, the elementary school re-opened as a full Rotary School hosting 900 pupils "making it the largest institution of its kind in Western Ontario"  at the time.

Re-naming: becoming J.E. Benson School 
On August 12, 1936, at the age of 63 Inspector John Edward Benson died from a heart attack. The Board of education decided to honour Mr. Benson by renaming Wyandotte Street School, giving it its current name, J.E. Benson School. A commemorative plaque can be seen hung in the hallway to the Auditorium.

J. E. Benson
J. E. Benson was the son of James Benson and Angeline Parliament; he was a resident of Roblin's Mills, Prince Edward County. Benson taught in public schools around Prince Edward County until he became the inspector for public schools in Prince Edward County, after his graduation from Queen's University. Inspector Benson was first appointed to His Windsor position on December 16, 1919 ; he started his duties February 1, 1920. Benson was the first educationalist to bring the rotary system to Canadian schools; he was a trusted school inspector for twenty five years. 
Inspector Benson died from a heart attack on August 12 1936 after returning to his summer home, his usual custom following the closing of schools for the summer; he "looked in good health"  when he retired for the night but suffered from a heart attack and died before help arrived.

Mascot 
The current mascot for J.E. Benson Public School is the Bobcat; they are known as "The Benson Bobcats".

Principals

List of staff: 2012–13

References

External links
J.E. Benson Public School

Elementary schools in Windsor, Ontario